Charles O'Hara (16 April 1746 – 19 September 1822) was an Irish landowner and politician.

He was born the son of Charles O'Hara (1715–1776) of Annaghmore, County Sligo, an MP in the Parliament of Ireland. He was educated at Christ Church, Oxford and entered the Middle Temple in 1765 to study law. He was called to the Irish bar in 1771 and succeeded his father in 1776.

He was then the leading landowner in Count Sligo and was a Member of Parliament in the Parliament of Ireland for Dungannon in 1776, sitting until 1783. He was afterwards MP for Sligo County from 1783 until the Union with Great Britain in 1800/01. After the Union he served as MP for Sligo County in the Parliament of the United Kingdom from 1801 to 1822. He also served as High Sheriff of Sligo for 1785–86 and as a Commissioner of the treasury in Ireland from April 1806 to April 1807.

He married Margaret, the daughter and heiress of John Cookson, MD, of Yorkshire, with whom he had a son and 3 daughters.

References

1746 births
1822 deaths
Alumni of Christ Church, Oxford
Members of the Middle Temple
Politicians from County Sligo
Irish MPs 1776–1783
Irish MPs 1783–1790
Irish MPs 1790–1797
Irish MPs 1798–1800
UK MPs 1801–1802
UK MPs 1802–1806
UK MPs 1807–1812
UK MPs 1812–1818
UK MPs 1818–1820
UK MPs 1820–1826
Irish Conservative Party MPs
Members of the Parliament of the United Kingdom for County Sligo constituencies (1801–1922)
High Sheriffs of County Sligo
Members of the Parliament of Ireland (pre-1801) for County Tyrone constituencies
Members of the Parliament of Ireland (pre-1801) for County Sligo constituencies